Girona is a Barcelona Metro station located in Carrer de Girona, underneath Carrer del Consell de Cent between Carrer del Bruc and Carrer de Bailèn, in Dreta de l'Eixample, part of the Eixample district of Barcelona, Catalonia, Spain. It is served by L4 (yellow line). The station was inaugurated in  along with the other stations from Urquinaona to Joanic.

Services

See also
List of Barcelona Metro stations

External links

Trenscat.com

Railway stations in Spain opened in 1973
Transport in Eixample
Barcelona Metro line 4 stations